Olivier Werner (born 16 April 1985) is a Belgian former professional football goalkeeper.

Career

Werner previously played for KV Mechelen, FC Brussels, Eupen, Mons and Cercle Brugge. Following the 2016–17 season, Werner's contract at Sochaux was not prolonged, making him a free agent player. In December 2017, he was signed by Excel Mouscron as an emergency goalkeeper, following injuries to Logan Bailly and Jean Butez.

References

External links
 
 
 

1985 births
Living people
People from Malmedy
Belgian footballers
Association football goalkeepers
Belgian Pro League players
Challenger Pro League players
Standard Liège players
R.E. Virton players
K.V. Mechelen players
R.W.D.M. Brussels F.C. players
K.A.S. Eupen players
R.A.E.C. Mons players
Cercle Brugge K.S.V. players
FC Sochaux-Montbéliard players
Royal Excel Mouscron players
Ligue 2 players
Footballers from Liège Province